Mount Pleasant is an unincorporated community in Gadsden County, Florida, United States. It is located near the intersection of Veterans' Memorial Highway and Mt. Pleasant Road. Mt. Pleasant borders the city of Gretna and the St. John/Robertsville community. It also borders the city of Chattahoochee.

Geography
Mount Pleasant is located at  (30.65722, -84.69111).

Government and infrastructure
The Mt. Pleasant Volunteer Fire Department operates one fire station.

Education
Gadsden County School District operates public schools. At one time there was a county school in Mount Pleasant. As of 2017 Gadsden County High School (formerly East Gadsden High School) is the only remaining zoned high school in the county due to the consolidation of West Gadsden High School's high school section into East Gadsden High.

Robert F. Munroe Day School, a K-12 private school which was founded as a segregation academy, has its main campus in Mount Pleasant. The main campus has  of land. The school's kindergarten campus is in Quincy proper.

Notable person
Kelvin Kirk, the first Mr. Irrelevant as the last player selected in the 1976 NFL Draft, who later played seven seasons in the Canadian Football League.

References

Unincorporated communities in Gadsden County, Florida
Tallahassee metropolitan area
Unincorporated communities in Florida